Sevinç  is a common feminine Turkish given name. In Turkish, "Sevinç" means "Joy", "Happiness" or "Glee".

People

Given name
 Sevinç Çorlu (born 1990), Turkish footballer
 Sevinç Erbulak (born 1975), Turkish actress

Surname
 Ayberk Sevinç (born 1988), Turkish volleyball player
 Burak Sevinç (born 1985), Turkish actor
 Dursun Sevinç (born 1972), Turkish weightlifter
 Metin Sevinç (born 1994), Turkish footballer
 Mümtaz Sevinç (born 1952), Turkish actor

Places
 Sevinç, Manavgat, a village in Manavgat district of Antalya Province, Turkey

Turkish feminine given names